Kim Sang-mun (born 6 January 1970) is a South Korean judoka. He competed in the men's half-lightweight event at the 1992 Summer Olympics.

References

1970 births
Living people
South Korean male judoka
Olympic judoka of South Korea
Judoka at the 1992 Summer Olympics
Place of birth missing (living people)